A (A-flat; also called la bémol) is the ninth semitone of the solfège.

It lies a diatonic semitone above G and a chromatic semitone below A, thus being enharmonic to G, even though in some musical tunings, A will have a different sounding pitch than G.

When calculated in equal temperament with a reference of A above middle C as 440 Hz, the frequency of the A above middle C (or A4) is approximately 415.305 Hz. See pitch (music) for a discussion of historical variations in frequency.

The notes A and G are the only notes to have only one enharmonic, since they cannot be reached in any other way by a single or double sharp or a single or double flat from any of the seven white notes.

Designation by octave

Scales

Common scales beginning on A
 A major: A B C D E F G A
 A natural minor: A B C D E F G A
 A harmonic minor: A B C D E F G A
 A melodic minor ascending: A B C D E F G A
 A melodic minor descending: A G F E D C B A

Diatonic scales
 A Ionian: A B C D E F G A
 A Dorian: A B C D E F G A
 A Phrygian: A B C D E F G A
 A Lydian: A B C D E F G A
 A Mixolydian: A B C D E F G A
 A Aeolian: A B C D E F G A
 A Locrian: A B C D E F G A

Jazz melodic minor
 A ascending melodic minor: A B C D E F G A
 A Dorian ♭2: A B C D E F G A
 A Lydian augmented: A B C D E F G A
 A Lydian dominant: A B C D E F G A
 A Mixolydian ♭6: A B C D E F G A
 A Locrian ♮2: A B C D E F G A
 A altered: A B C D E F G A

See also
 Piano key frequencies
 A-flat major
 A-flat minor
 Root (chord)

Musical notes